Joseph Francis O'Connell (December 7, 1872 – December 10, 1942) was an American lawyer, academic, and politician who served as a U.S. Representative from Boston, Massachusetts from 1907 to 1911.

Early life and education
Born in Boston, Massachusetts, O'Connell attended the Mather School of Boston and prepared for college at St. Mary's Parochial School. He was graduated from Boston College in 1893. While at Boston College, O'Connell and Joseph Drum helped create the first Boston College football team.

O'Connell was graduated from Harvard University Law School in 1896, was admitted to the Suffolk bar in 1897, and commenced the practice of law in Boston.

U.S. Representative 
O'Connell was elected as a Democrat to the Sixtieth and Sixty-first Congresses (March 4, 1907 - March 3, 1911). In 1908, he was re-elected by just 4 votes over former Boston City Clerk J. Mitchel Galvin.

He was an unsuccessful candidate for renomination in 1910. In a three-way primary with former Representative William S. McNary and Boston City Councilor James Michael Curley, O'Connell came in second behind Curley.

Later career
After his defeat in 1910, O'Connell resumed the practice of law in Boston and remained active in politics. He served as a delegate to the 1912 Democratic National Convention.

In 1914, O'Connell was appointed to the National Conference on Uniform State Laws by Governor David I. Walsh. He was re-appointed by each succeeding governor and served until his death.

In May 1917, O'Connell was elected to serve as a member of the Massachusetts Constitutional Convention, representing the 12th congressional district. The convention convened on June 6, 1917 and adjourned on August 13, 1919.

O'Connell served as a delegate to the 1920 Democratic National Convention.

In 1923, O'Connell served as member of the State commission to revise the charter of the city of Boston in 1923.

O'Connell unsuccessfully ran for United States Senate in 1930 and Mayor of Boston in 1933.

Personal life 
On November 23, 1910, O'Connell married Marasita Lenahan, daughter of his former Congressional colleague John T. Lenahan, at St. Mary's Church in Wilkes-Barre, Pennsylvania.  The couple had 11 children.

He was Professor of Law and vice president of the board of trustees of Suffolk Law School in Boston.

Death
O'Connell died in Boston on December 10, 1942, three days after his 70th birthday and was interred at St. Joseph's Cemetery, West Roxbury, Massachusetts.

References

Bibliography
Beatty. Jack .: The Rascal King: The Life and Times of James Michael Curley (1874–1958) Da Capo Press, (2000) pp. 114–116. 
Journal of the Constitutional Convention of the Commonwealth of Massachusetts  (1919) pp. 7–8, 865, 971.Who's who in State Politics, 1908'' Practical Politics  (1908) p. 18.

External links

O'Connell's biography on his law firms website.

1872 births
1942 deaths
American educators
Harvard Law School alumni
Massachusetts lawyers
Members of the 1917 Massachusetts Constitutional Convention
People from Greater Boston
Boston College Eagles football players
Democratic Party members of the United States House of Representatives from Massachusetts
People from Dorchester, Massachusetts
Catholics from Massachusetts